Valeri Bondarenko (born 22 April 1953) is an Estonian football coach and a former player.

Playing career
1971–1979 he played for FC Norma Tallinn.

Coaching career
1993–1994 he was the assistant coach of the Estonia national football team. 1998–1999 he was an assistant and head coach of the Estonian U18 team.
In 1997–1998, 1999–2000, 2004–2008 and 2010 he was the coach of JK Narva Trans, 2000–2003 FC Levadia's coach and 2008–2009 Rovaniemi PS's coach. He briefly managed Russian Second Division club FC Lokomotiv Nizhny Novgorod during 2004.

He was the head coach of the Swedish football club Syrianska FC since 26 January 2011 until the end of the 2011 season.

References

External links
Profile at KLISF

1953 births
Living people
Sportspeople from Võru
Estonian people of Ukrainian descent
Estonian football managers
Estonian expatriate football managers
JK Sillamäe Kalev managers
Soviet footballers
Estonian footballers
JK Narva Trans managers
Association footballers not categorized by position
Estonian expatriate sportspeople in Sweden
Estonian expatriate sportspeople in Russia
Expatriate football managers in Sweden
Expatriate football managers in Russia